Rennweg is a medieval main road and is today part of the inner-city pedestrian zone of Zürich, Switzerland. A rennweg was in the medieval German speaking territories a street where horses were moved. Once, it was one of the nodal points of road and public transportation. Today, as well as the Limmatquai, as well as Augustinergasse, it is a section of the southern extension of the Seeuferanlage promenades that were built between 1881 and 1887. Rennweg is one of the best known visitor attractions of the oldest area of the city of Zürich.

Geography and history 
Archaeologists excavated individual and aerial finds of the Celtic-Helvetii oppidum Lindenhof from around the 1st century BC La Tène culture, whose remains were discovered in archaeological campaigns in the years 1989, 1997, 2004 and 2007 on Lindenhof, Münsterhof and Rennweg, and also in the 1900s, but the finds mistakenly were identified as Roman objects. Not yet archaeologically proven, but suggested by the historians, as well for the first construction of the today's Münsterbrücke Limmat crossing, the present Weinplatz square was the former civilian harbour of the Celtic-Roman Turicum, and so the term Weinplatz may have kept its ancient meaning wine square.

In the European Middle Ages, it was the main street of the upper town of Zürich, leading from the Rennwegtor gate in the fortifications of Zürich and passing below the Lindenhof hill towards the town hall. The  site of the Rennweg gate is at the current junction of the Rennweg with the Bahnhofstrasse, the Bahnhofstrasse itself following the course of the 13th-century Fröschengraben, the inner moat that was enforced by the later built Schanzengraben.

Accounts of the Battle of St. Jakob an der Sihl in the Old Zürich War, which occurred on July 22, 1443, describe that Zurich Mayor
Rudolf Stüssi fell while trying to defend the bridge across the Sihl. The city was then saved by the gatekeeper's wife, one Anna Ziegler, who managed to lower the portcullis of the Rennweg gate just as the pursuing enemy troops were about to enter the city.

Transportation 
The Rennweg respectively former Rennweg–Augustinergasse stop on lines 6, 7, 11 and 13 of the Zürich tram system is some  further southernly along the Bahnhofstrasse road.

References

External links 

Altstadt (Zürich)
Streets in Zürich
Pedestrian streets in Switzerland